Big Audio Dynamite (later known as Big Audio Dynamite II and Big Audio, and often abbreviated BAD) are a British musical group formed in 1984 by the ex-guitarist and singer of the Clash, Mick Jones. The group is noted for its effective mixture of varied musical styles, incorporating elements of punk rock, dance music, hip hop, reggae, and funk. BAD's one constant throughout frequent shifts in membership and musical direction is the vocals provided by Mick Jones. After releasing a number of well-received albums and touring extensively throughout the 1980s and 1990s, Big Audio Dynamite disbanded in 1997. In 2011, the band embarked on a reunion tour.

Albums

Studio albums

Live albums

Compilation albums

Video albums

Singles

Notes

References

Discographies of British artists
Pop music group discographies
Rock music group discographies